In enzymology, a glucose-6-phosphate 1-epimerase is an enzyme that catalyzes the chemical reaction

alpha-D-glucose 6-phosphate  beta-D-glucose 6-phosphate

Hence, this enzyme has one substrate, alpha-D-glucose 6-phosphate, and one product, beta-D-glucose 6-phosphate.

This enzyme belongs to the family of isomerases, specifically those racemases and epimerases acting on carbohydrates and derivatives.  The systematic name of this enzyme class is D-glucose-6-phosphate 1-epimerase. This enzyme participates in glycolysis / gluconeogenesis.

Structural studies

References

 

EC 5.1.3
Enzymes of known structure